Brian Behan (10 November 1926 – 2 November 2002) was an Irish writer, public speaker, lecturer, and trade unionist.

Early years
Behan was born in Dublin, the son of Stephen Behan and Kathleen Behan (née Kearney), nephew of Peadar Kearney (author of Amhrán na bhFiann, the Irish National Anthem), younger brother of Brendan Behan and older brother of Dominic Behan. He is the father of the playwright and actress Janet Behan, journalist Rosemary Behan, writer and musician Ruth Behan, musician and poet Daniel Tobias Behan. and Linsey Jane Behan, solicitor.

After being caught stealing money from the gas meter of a neighbour (an act he later tended to gloss over – describing it as "some minor trouble"), he was sent to what was effectively a penal institution, the Artane Industrial School, which could be described as a reformatory. Behan later claimed he was systematically abused at Artane; investigations into the school later found widespread instances of physical, emotional, and sexual abuse. Behan applied for and was posthumously awarded damages for the abuse – though he never fully recovered and would never return permanently to Ireland after leaving, as was the case with many victims of similar mistreatment.

After Behan was released from Artane School he joined the Irish Army's construction corps.

Move to England and politics
In 1950, Behan moved to London to work as a labourer.  Having long considered himself an anarcho-syndicalist, he became a prominent trade union activist and was imprisoned in Brixton Prison for leading a go-slow on the Festival of Britain construction site.

Behan then joined the Communist Party of Great Britain (CPGB) and soon became a member of its executive committee.  He was taken on a tour of Eastern Europe, Russia and China, meeting Joseph Stalin and Mao Zedong, but was unimpressed. In 1956, he left the CPGB in protest at the Soviet invasion of Hungary, instead joining the Trotskyist group The Club, who were active in the Labour Party.  He quickly became the group's secretary, and in 1958, he wrote his first work, Socialists and the Trade Unions.

In 1958, Behan obtained work on the Shell Centre site. He was soon sacked, at which the shop stewards' committee called a strike, which was given the full support of The Club.  Brendan Behan came to support his brother on the picket line, but Brian was arrested after a scuffle and again jailed. The official union, the Amalgamated Union of Building Trade Workers, opposed the strike and this, combined with Behan's opposition to the Labour Party, convinced The Club to leave and constitute the organisation as the Socialist Labour League (SLL). Behan became increasingly uneasy about SLL leader Gerry Healy's control of the organisation, and was also concerned that Healy was reluctant to cut ties with the Labour Party. In May 1960, he was expelled from the group, along with a few supporters. Behan then founded a short-lived "Workers' Party", which published Workers' Voice and was active in support of the 1966 seamen's strike.

Writer and lecturer
In 1964, Behan wrote his first piece on his family life, With Breast Expanded.  Forced to give up building work due to an arm injury, he moved to live on a boat in Shoreham-by-Sea and studied history and English at Sussex University.  He then studied teaching, before in 1973 becoming a lecturer in media studies at the London College of Printing. In 1972, he contested a swearing match at the British Museum, to mark the republication of Robert Graves' Lars Porsena.

Turning increasingly to writing, Behan completed Time To Go in 1979, Mother of All The Behans in 1984, Kathleen in 1988, these last two inspired by his family life. Mother of all the Behans would become a successful Dublin, London and New York theatrical production. Featuring Rosaleen Linehan, and produced and directed by Peter Sheridan, it ultimately became Behan's biggest critical success. In 1990, he also had his most successful theatrical run, with "Boots for the Footless" enjoying a 6-week sold-out run at the Tricycle Theatre, Kilburn; a promised West End production failed to materialise, however, when the financier fell from a balcony.

In 1989, he retired from teaching and moved to Brighton, where he frequented the local naturist beach, and worked on a number of plays, most of which were staged in the town. In the years before his death, his then-burgeoning acting career expanded to include a number of television commercials, and a short skit for MTV, where he portrayed an aged Keith Flint (frontman for electronic band The Prodigy).

Further reading
With Breast Expanded. London: MacGibbon & Kee, 1964.

References

1926 births
2002 deaths
Academics of the London College of Communication
Alumni of the University of Sussex
Anarchist writers
Anarcho-syndicalists
Communist Party of Great Britain members
Irish anarchists
Irish Army soldiers
Irish emigrants to the United Kingdom
Irish male non-fiction writers
Trade unionists from London
Irish Trotskyists
People from Brighton
Writers from Dublin (city)
Workers Revolutionary Party (UK) members